In sociology, the East–West dichotomy is the perceived difference between the Eastern and the Western worlds. Cultural and religious rather than geographical in division, the boundaries of East and West are not fixed, but vary according to the criteria adopted by individuals using the term.

Used in discussing such studies as management, economics, international relations, and linguistics, the concept is criticized for overlooking regional hybridity.

Divisions 
Conceptually, the boundaries are cultural, rather than geographical, as a result of which Australia and New Zealand are typically grouped in the 
West (despite being geographically in the east), while Islamic nations are, regardless of location, grouped in the East.  However, there are a few Muslim-majority regions in Europe which do not fit this dichotomy. The culture line can be particularly difficult to place in regions of cultural diversity such as Bosnia and Herzegovina, whose citizens may themselves identify as East or West depending on ethnic or religious background. Further, residents of different parts of the world perceive the boundaries differently; for example, some European scholars define Russia as East, but most agree that it is the West's second complementary part, and Islamic nations regard it and other predominantly Christian nations as the West. Another unanswered question is whether Siberia (North Asia) is "Eastern" or "Western."

Historical concepts 

The concept has been used in both "Eastern" and "Western" nations. Japanese sinologist Tachibana Shiraki, in the 1920s, wrote of the need to unify Asia—East Asia, South Asia and Southeast Asia but excluding Central Asia and West Asia—and form a "New East" that might combine culturally in balancing against the West. Japan continued to make much of the concept, known as Pan-Asianism, throughout World War II, in propaganda. In China, it was encapsulated during the Cold War in a 1957 speech by Mao Zedong, who launched a slogan when he said, "This is a war between two worlds. The West Wind cannot prevail over the East Wind; the East Wind is bound to prevail over the West Wind."

To Western writers, in the 1940s, it became bound up with an idea of aggressive, "frustrated nationalism", which was seen as "intrinsically anti- or non-Western"; sociologist Frank Furedi wrote, "The already existing intellectual assessment of European nationalism adapted to the growth of the Third World variety by developing the couplet of mature Western versus immature Eastern nationalism.... This East-West dichotomy became an accepted part of Western political theory."

The 1978 book Orientalism, by Edward Said, was highly influential in further establishing concepts of the East–West dichotomy in the Western world, bringing into college lectures a notion of the East as "characterized by religious sensibilities, familial social orders, and ageless traditions" in contrast to Western "rationality, material and technical dynamism, and individualism."

More recently, the divide has also been posited as an Islamic "East" and an American and European "West." Critics note that an Islamic/non-Islamic East–West dichotomy is complicated by the global dissemination of Islamic fundamentalism and by cultural diversity within Islamic nations, moving the argument "beyond that of an East-West dichotomy and into a tripartite situation."

Applications 
The East–West dichotomy has been used in studying a range of topics, including management, economics and linguistics. Knowledge Creation and Management (2007) examines it as the difference in organizational learning between Western cultures and the Eastern world. It has been widely used in exploring the period of rapid economic growth that has been termed the "East-Asian miracle" in segments of East Asia, particularly the Asian Tigers, following World War II. Some sociologists, in line with the West as a model of modernity posited by Arnold J. Toynbee, have perceived the economic expansion as a sign of the "Westernization" of the region, but others look for explanation in cultural/racial characteristics of the East, embracing concepts of fixed Eastern cultural identity in a phenomenon described as "New Orientalism". Both approaches to the East–West dichotomy have been criticized for failing to take into account the historical hybridity of the regions.

The concept has also been brought to bear on examinations of intercultural communication. Asians are widely described as embracing an "inductive speech pattern" in which a primary point is approached indirectly, but Western societies are said to use "deductive speech" in which speakers immediately establish their point. That is attributed to a higher priority among Asians in harmonious interrelations, but Westerners are said to prioritize direct communication. 2001's Intercultural Communication: A Discourse Approach described the East–West dichotomy linguistically as a "false dichotomy", noting that both Asian and Western speakers use both forms of communication.

Criticism 

In addition to difficulties in defining regions and overlooking hybridity, the East–West dichotomy has been criticized for creating an artificial construct of regional unification that allows one voice to claim authority to speak for multitudes. In "The Triumph of the East?", Mark T. Berger speaks to the issue as relates to examination of the "East-Asian miracle": 
The historical power of the East-West dichotomy, and the fixed conceptions of culture/race to which it is linked, have increasingly allowed the national elites of the region to speak not only for their 'nations,' but even for Asia and Asians.... There are numerous instances of Western scholars, intent on challenging North American and/or Western hegemony in both material and discursive terms, ending up uncritically privileging the elite narratives of power-holders in Asia as authentic representatives of a particular non-Western nation or social formation (and also contributing to the continued use of the East-West dichotomy).

See also 
 Clash of Civilizations
 Global North and Global South
 Inglehart–Welzel cultural map of the world
 Oriental Despotism
 Orientalism

References

Further reading 
Balancing the East, Upgrading the West; U.S. Grand Strategy in an Age of Upheaval by Zbigniew Brzezinski January/February 2012 Foreign Affairs

Cultural regions
Dichotomies
International relations theory
Political theories